Bela dama Devinska is a novel by Slovenian author Dušan Jelinčič. It was first published in 2010.

See also
List of Slovenian novels

Slovenian novels
2010 novels